Adam John Crosthwaite (born 22 September 1984) is an Australian former professional cricketer who played for Victoria, New South Wales and South Australia as a wicket keeper. He was part of Australia's Under-19 World Cup win in 2002.

Due to the emergence of Matthew Wade in the Victorian Side in 2010 Crosthwaite moved to New South Wales. He played for the Adelaide Strikers in the inaugural Twenty20 Big Bash League and moved to play for South Australia. He was member of the 2011–12 Ryobi One-Day Cup winning team for South Australia.

External links

1984 births
Australian cricketers
Living people
Victoria cricketers
Adelaide Strikers cricketers
Cricketers from Melbourne
South Australia cricketers
Wicket-keepers